Amphidromus abbasi is a species of air-breathing land snail, a terrestrial pulmonate gastropod mollusc in the family Camaenidae.

Information about this species has been published in 2008 and the nomen nudum has been validated in 2010.

References

External links 

abbasi
Gastropods described in 2010